The 2007 Men's European Volleyball League was the fourth edition of the European Volleyball League, organised by Europe's governing volleyball body, the CEV. The Final Four was held in Portimão, Portugal from 7 to 8 July 2005.

Competing nations

Squads

League round

Pool A

|}

Pool B

|}

Pool C

|}

Semi-finals

Third place match

Final

Final standing

Awards

Most Valuable Player
  Guillermo Falasca
Best Scorer
  Guillermo Falasca
Best Spiker
  Hugo Gaspar
Best Blocker
  Emanuel Kohút
Best Server
  André Lopes
Best Setter
  Michal Masný
Best Receiver
  Israel Rodríguez
Best Libero
  Carlos Teixeira

References
 Official website

European Volleyball League
E
V
International volleyball competitions hosted by Portugal